The Charles-Blanc Prize was an annual award of the Académie Française for the author(s) of works in the fields of History and Sociology. The prize was awarded from 1898 to 1994, and was named after French art critic and historian, Charles Blanc.

Recipients

See also 

 Académie Française
 Former prizes awarded by the Académie française

References 

Académie Française awards